HMS Alexandra was a central battery ironclad of the Victorian Royal Navy, whose seagoing career was from 1877 to 1900.  She spent much of her career as a flagship, and took part in operations to deter the Russian Empire's aggression against the Ottoman Empire in 1878 and the bombardment of Alexandria in 1882. She was affectionately known by her crew as Old Alex.

She was named after Princess Alexandra (later Queen Alexandra) wife of Edward, Prince of Wales (later King Edward VII).

Background
At the time of her design the Board of Admiralty were at loggerheads amongst themselves as regards the provision of sails in their contemporary warships; steam engine design had advanced to the point where ships could cross the Atlantic under steam power alone, but centuries of tradition had left an ingrained emotional attachment to sails in a small but influential number of the senior members of the naval hierarchy. This minority succeeded in convincing the Board to design Alexandra as a rigged central battery vessel.

Design

Built at Chatham Dockyard with engines by Messrs Humphreys and Tennant, Alexandra was the last of a long series of progressive steps in the development of vessels of her type.  As the militarily most effective of all of the broadside ironclads, she was, ironically, designed by Nathaniel Barnaby, one of the earliest and most effective proponents of the virtues of turret-mounted artillery.

Her armament was disposed in a central box battery, with heavy guns deployed both on the main and on the upper deck. Recognising the increasing importance of axial fire, Barnaby arranged the artillery so that, by firing through embrasures, there was the capability of deploying four heavy guns to fire dead ahead, and two astern; all guns could if required fire on the broadside.

Alexandra was the last British battleship to carry her main armament wholly below decks; she was one of only two British ships to mount guns of  calibre, the other being HMS Temeraire.

At the time of her completion Alexandra was the fastest battleship afloat.

It had been intended to call the ship HMS Superb, but the name was changed at her launching, which was undertaken by Her Royal Highness the Princess of Wales (later Queen Alexandra). She was the first British ironclad to be launched by a member of the Royal Family; the Duke and Duchess of Edinburgh, the Duke and Duchess of Teck and the Duke of Cambridge were also present. The religious element of the service (the first at a ship launch since the Reformation) was conducted by Archibald Campbell Tait the then Archbishop of Canterbury assisted by Thomas Legh Claughton, the Bishop of Rochester.

Service history

She was commissioned at Chatham on 2 January 1877 as flagship, Mediterranean Fleet, and held this position continuously until 1889. She was the flagship of Admiral Hornby in his passage through the Dardanelles during the Russian war scare of 1878. On 9 February, she ran aground in bad weather at the narrowest part of the strait and was towed off by HMS Sultan in time to lead the squadron to Constantinople. She was present at the bombardment of Alexandria in 1882; in this action the Admiral's flag was shifted to HMS Invincible, as she was of shallower draught and could sail closer to shore. During this action on 11 July 1882, under command of Captain C. F. Hotham, Gunner Israel Harding flung a live 10-inch enemy shell into a tub of water, an action which led to the award of the Victoria Cross. In 1886, the Duke of Edinburgh hoisted his flag on board, and Prince George of Wales, later King George V, joined as a lieutenant. She paid off in 1889 for modernisation.

In 1891, she was flagship of the Admiral Superintendent of Naval Reserves at Portsmouth, and remained so until 1901.  Alexandra was featured in the first volume of the Navy and Army Illustrated in early c. April 1896 and was then described as a "coastguard ship at Portsmouth" with her principal armament being eight 18-tons guns, four 22-ton, six 4-inch and four six-pounder and six three-pounder quick firers.  At this time, she had a complement of 408 officers and men and was commanded by Captain W.H. Pigott.  Her last sea-time was as flagship of the "B" fleet in the manoeuvres of 1900. In 1903 she became a mechanical training ship, and she was sold in 1908.

References

Publications
 
 Oscar Parkes  British Battleships  
 Conway  All the World's Fighting Ships

External links
 

 

Battleships of the Royal Navy
Ships built in Chatham
1875 ships
Victorian-era battleships of the United Kingdom
Maritime incidents in February 1878
Maritime incidents in October 1879